Therese Ann Rutherford (November 2, 1917 – June 11, 2012) was a Canadian-born American actress in film, radio, and television. She had a long career starring and co-starring in films, playing Polly Benedict during the 1930s and 1940s in the Andy Hardy series, and appearing as one of Scarlett O'Hara's sisters in the film Gone with the Wind (1939).

Early life
Rutherford was born on November 2, 1917, in Vancouver, British Columbia to John Rutherford and Lucille (née Mansfield; 1890–1981) Rutherford. Rutherford's mother was a silent film actress, and her father was a former operatic tenor. While Rutherford was still a baby, the family moved to San Francisco. Soon afterwards, her parents separated and Lucille Mansfield moved to Los Angeles, with Ann and her sister Laurette, who later became known as Judith Arlen.

While roller skating home from middle school in Hollywood, Rutherford would stop at some of the radio studios to listen to voice actors perform. After being criticized one day by her English teacher, Rutherford decided to show her up. The girl falsified an acting history and applied for work at radio station KFAC. A month later, Rutherford had a part in a radio serial drama.

Career

Film career
In 1935, Rutherford began her Hollywood film career in the starring role of Joan O'Brien in the dramatic film Waterfront Lady for Mascot Pictures, later to be Republic Pictures. Rutherford soon established herself as a popular leading lady of Western films at Republic, costarring with actors Gene Autry and John Wayne.

In 1937, Rutherford left Republic and signed a film contract with Metro-Goldwyn-Mayer studios. At MGM, Rutherford appeared as the Spirit of Christmas Past in A Christmas Carol (1938) and Lydia Bennet in Pride and Prejudice (1940) among other roles.

In 1938, MGM loaned Rutherford to Selznick International Pictures to appear as Carreen O'Hara, a sister of Scarlett O'Hara, in the film Gone with the Wind (1939). MGM boss Louis Mayer originally refused the loan because he considered the role too minor, but Rutherford passionately appealed to him to change his mind. In December 1939, while promoting the new movie, Rutherford visited six Confederate Army veterans at the Confederate Soldiers Home near Atlanta. One of the veterans gave Rutherford a rose corsage tied with Confederate colors.

From 1937 until 1942, Rutherford portrayed Polly Benedict in the MGM Andy Hardy youth comedy film series with actor Mickey Rooney. Her first film in this series was You're Only Young Once (1937) and the last was Andy Hardy's Double Life (1942). Rutherford's performances as Andy Hardy's sweet and patient girlfriend established her screen popularity.

Rutherford also played Carol Lambert, comedian Red Skelton's screen girlfriend, for MGM in a series of mystery/comedies: Whistling in the Dark (1941), Whistling in Dixie (1942), and Whistling in Brooklyn (1943).

In the early 1940s, Rutherford left MGM to work without contract with different studios. During this period, she starred in films such as Orchestra Wives (1942) with 20th Century Fox, Two O'Clock Courage (1945) with RKO Radio Pictures, and The Secret Life of Walter Mitty (1947), also with RKO. In 1950, Rutherford retired from films. Despite Mickey Rooney's pleas, she passed on returning as Polly Benedict in the final Andy Hardy film, Andy Hardy Comes Home (1958), stating that she didn't believe most people married their first sweethearts and that Andy Hardy becoming a judge was implausible.

Later career

Rutherford was the heroine of a novel, Ann Rutherford and the Key to Nightmare Hall (1942 by Katherine Heisenfelt), where "the heroine has the same name and appearance as the famous actress but has no connection ... it is as though the famous actress has stepped into an alternate reality in which she is an ordinary person." The story was probably written for a young teenage audience and is reminiscent of the adventures of Nancy Drew. It is part of a series known as "Whitman Authorized Editions", 16 books published between 1941 and 1947 that featured a film actress as heroine.

Among her television appearances, Rutherford co-starred in "Suppressed Desires" on The Nash Airflyte Theater (November 23, 1950). She guest starred in four episodes of Perry Mason. Her first appearance was in the 1959 episode "The Case of the Howling Dog," when she played defendant Evelyn Forbes. 

In 1972, Rutherford returned to MGM to make the film They Only Kill Their Masters. Ironically (given the film's grisly name), the film was shot on the old Andy Hardy set. On radio, Ann Rutherford replaced Penny Singleton as the title character on the Blondie show. In the 1970s, Rutherford made two guest appearances on television as Aggie Harrison, the mother of Suzanne Pleshette's character Emily Hartley, on The Bob Newhart Show.

During the 1990s, Rutherford was offered the role of Rose Calvert in the film Titanic (1997), but turned it down; the role went to Gloria Stuart. On November 2, 2002, Rutherford celebrated her 85th birthday, surrounded by her fans and friends at a luncheon in Beverly Hills, California. Neither Evelyn Keyes (1916–2008), then suffering from Alzheimer's disease, nor Olivia de Havilland, two of her surviving co-stars from Gone with the Wind, was able to attend. In October 2004, Rutherford made a guest appearance at the Margaret Mitchell birthday celebration in Jonesboro, Georgia to honor the film Gone With the Wind. Rutherford signed autographs and reminisced with fans about old times.

In June 2007, she was the guest star at the Marietta Gone With the Wind Museum in Marietta, Georgia. The occasion was "The Heart and History of Hollywood" event with Turner Classic Movies (TCM) host Robert Osborne serving as emcee. Rutherford was scheduled to return to Marietta on July 4, 2008, to be reunited with four of the surviving costars from Gone with the Wind; Cammie King, Fred Crane, Mickey Kuhn, and Patrick Curtis. Fred Crane died on August 21, 2008, and Cammie King died on September 1, 2010. In 2012, she was interviewed, along with Anne Jeffreys, by Huell Howser on an episode of California's Gold.

Personal life and death
Rutherford was married twice. On December 31, 1942, she married David May II, the grandson of the founder of the May Company department stores; the couple had a daughter, Gloria May, in 1943. On June 6, 1953, Rutherford and May were divorced in a court in Juárez, Mexico. On October 7, 1953, in New York City, Rutherford married actor/producer William Dozier, the creator of the Batman (1966–1968) TV series. Dozier died in Santa Monica, California of a stroke on April 23, 1991. Her companion of twenty years was Al Morley.

Rutherford died on June 11, 2012, aged 94 at her home in Beverly Hills, California, following declining health due to heart problems. She was cremated, and her ashes given to her daughter.

Filmography

Features

Short subjects

References

Further reading

External links
 

 

1917 births
2012 deaths
20th-century Canadian actresses
20th-century American actresses
Actresses from Vancouver
American film actresses
American stage actresses
American television actresses
Canadian emigrants to the United States
Canadian child actresses
Canadian film actresses
Canadian stage actresses
Canadian television actresses
Metro-Goldwyn-Mayer contract players
21st-century American women